Sir John Hay   (23 June 1816 – 20 January 1892) was a New South Wales politician.

Life
Hay was born at Little Ythsie, Aberdeenshire, Scotland, the son of John Hay (a farmer) and his wife Jean, née Mair. Hay graduated M.A. at King's College (now part of the University of Aberdeen), in 1834, and then studied law at Edinburgh, but did not finish it.  In 1838 Hay married Mary Chalmers and they travelled to Sydney on the Amelia Thompson, arriving on 1 July and settled at 'Welaregang' station on the Upper Murray.

Hay was a strong opponent of tariffs on trade between New South Wales and Victoria and was elected in April 1856 as the member for Murrumbidgee in the first Legislative Assembly.  He took up residence in Sydney but continued to maintain his Murrumbidgee runs.  In September, he moved a vote of no-confidence in the Cowper ministry, which brought the government down. Hay recommended to governor William Denison that Henry W. Parker should be asked to form a coalition ministry in which Hay was Secretary for Lands and Works. This ministry was defeated in September 1857 and Hay did not again hold office. He was elected as the member for the new seat of Murray at the 1859 election, and strongly opposed John Robertson's land bills and sought to protect the interests of squatters. In the December 1860 elections, fought on the issue, he was one a few opponents of Robertson elected.

In June 1860, Hay moved that negotiations should be opened up with Victoria for the purpose of establishing a uniformity of customs duties. This would have been a valuable step towards a federation system, but his motion was defeated. On 14 October 1862, Hay was unanimously elected Speaker of the Legislative Assembly and carried out his duties impartially. Hay successfully contested the seat Central Cumberland at the 1864 election, near Sydney to make clear his opposition to the making of the Riverina into a separate colony. In October 1865, finding his health had been affected, he resigned as speaker.

In June 1867 he resigned from the Legislative Assembly and was appointed to the Legislative Council. In July 1873 was appointed its President on the recommendation of Sir Henry Parkes, and held this position until his death.  Hay was created a K.C.M.G. in 1878.

They had no children.

Hay was not a party man but he had knowledge and wisdom, and though he originated little he was a good speaker and debater who had no little influence on the legislation of his time. Hay carried out his duties as speaker of the assembly and president of the council with great ability.

Legacy
The township of Hay on the lower Murrumbidgee River was named after John Hay.

References

External links
 
 
 

1816 births
1892 deaths
Members of the New South Wales Legislative Assembly
Members of the New South Wales Legislative Council
Scottish emigrants to colonial Australia
Knights Commander of the Order of St Michael and St George
Alumni of the University of Aberdeen
Alumni of the University of Edinburgh
Presidents of the New South Wales Legislative Council
19th-century Australian politicians